Novy Atkul (Yañı Atkül) is a rural locality (a village) in Nizhnekachmashevsky Selsoviet, Kaltasinsky District, Bashkortostan, Russia. The population was 68 as of 2010. There are 2 streets.

Geography 
Novy Atkul is located 6 km west of Kaltasy (the district's administrative centre) by road. Nizhny Kachmash is the nearest rural locality.

References 

Rural localities in Kaltasinsky District